Negre or Nègre is the surname of:

Ademar lo Negre (fl. 1210-1219), troubadour from Languedoc
Charles Nègre (1820–1880), French pioneering photographer
Dubravka Negre, married name of Serbian politician Dubravka Đedović
Ed Negre (1929-2014), American NASCAR driver
 Ernest Nègre (1907-2000), a French toponymist
Léopold Nègre (1879-1961), French biologist
Louis Nègre (born 1947), French politician and member of the Senate of France